Centro de Congresos Queretaro is a multipurpose convention center and indoor arena located in Queretaro, Queretaro. It was started in 2007 and finished after a two year pause of the construction, in 2011, due to the continued growth of both the city and the state. Prior to the completion of the Centro de Congresos, the Auditorio Josefa Ortiz de Dominguez was the largest indoor venue in Queretaro. However, that arena had been built in 1985, when Queretaro's population was less than half its current population. The growth of Queretaro's population eventually escalated to the point that a venue with a much larger capacity was needed, resulting in this venue.

Gran Salon Queretaro
For trade shows, the hall can accommodate 328 stands. In front of the Gran Salon Queretaro is a  outdoor terrace.

Among the earliest entertainment acts at the Gran Salon Queretaro were Ximena Sarinana, Sheyla Tadeo and Los Tigres del Norte.

Casa de los Corregidores
It is used for banquets, conferences and conventions.

Teatro Metropolitano
The Teatro Metropolitano is a performing arts complex consisting of a 1,335-seat concert hall used for concerts, stage shows and orchestra performances and two smaller theaters, one of which seats 330 and is used for local plays, and the 120-seat Sala de Danza, used for dance recitals

External links
Official website

References

Convention centers in Mexico
Concert halls in Mexico
Music venues in Mexico
Querétaro City